Doyle Lawson (born April 20, 1944) is an American traditional bluegrass and Southern gospel musician. He is best known as a mandolin player, vocalist, producer, and leader of the 6-man group Doyle Lawson & Quicksilver. Lawson was inducted into the International Bluegrass Music Hall of Fame in 2012.

Early life

Doyle Lawson was born in Fordtown, Sullivan County, Tennessee, the son of Leonard and Minnie Lawson. The Lawson family moved to Sneedville in 1954. Lawson grew up listening to the Grand Ole Opry on Saturday nights. This is where he heard mandolinist Bill Monroe, the "founding father" of bluegrass, and his band the Blue Grass Boys.

Lawson became interested in playing the mandolin around the age of eleven so his father borrowed a mandolin from Willis Byrd, a family friend and fellow musician. Doyle taught himself how to play the mandolin by listening to the radio and records, and watching an occasional TV show. Later Lawson learned to play the guitar and banjo as well.

Career

Early career
In 1963, aged 18 or 19, Lawson went to Nashville to play the banjo with Jimmy Martin and the Sunny Mountain Boys.

In 1966, he started playing with J.D. Crowe and the Kentucky Mountain Boys (later called the New South) in Lexington, Kentucky. He returned to play the mandolin and sing tenor with Martin in 1969 for six months, and then played again with Crowe until August 1971.

In September, 1971, Lawson started playing with The Country Gentlemen and remained part of the band for almost eight years. During that time, in 1977, he backed up U.S. Senator Robert Byrd on his Mountain Fiddler album. In  March 1979, Lawson left the Country Gentlemen with the intention of forming a band and creating his own sound.

Doyle Lawson & Quicksilver
Within a month Lawson had formed Doyle Lawson and Foxfire, with Jimmy Haley on guitar, Lou Reid on bass, and Terry Baucom on banjo.  The band name was soon changed to Doyle Lawson and Quicksilver. In 1981, through Sugar Hill Records, Lawson with this lineup released the critically acclaimed Rock My Soul, an album that would become a landmark bluegrass gospel project.  With a new bassist, Randy Graham, the band recorded a second gospel album, Heavenly Treasures, also on Sugar Hill.

Shortly thereafter, Graham, Baucom and Haley left to form their own band.  Lawson hired guitarist Russell Moore, banjoist Scott Vestal and bassist Curtis Vestal, and continued to perform.  After a time Ray Deaton took over on bass.

In 1989 the band won song of the year at the International Bluegrass Music Awards for "Little Mountain Church House". In 1997, "There's a Light Guiding Me" was a 39th Annual Grammy Award nominee for Best Southern Gospel, Country Gospel or Bluegrass Gospel Album. Through the years, Quicksilver toured regularly, performing at festivals concerts and other musical events.

In 1998, Lawson and Quicksilver became the first bluegrass band to perform at the National Quartet Convention. Lawson and Quicksilver performed in Ontario, Canada at the Tottenham Bluegrass Festival in June 2001 and again in June 2015. Lawson and Quicksilver provided the background vocals to the song "Dazzling Blue" on Paul Simon's 2011 album "So Beautiful or So What". In 2015, "In Session" was nominated for Best Bluegrass Album at the 58th Annual Grammy Awards.

Lawson composed a number of the band's songs and tunes. His instrumental piece, "Rosine," is a tribute to Monroe's birthplace and features, among other things, strains from the singer's 1967 instrumental "Kentucky Mandolin". Lawson hosts the annual Doyle Lawson and Quicksilver Festival in Denton, North Carolina. In 2021, Lawson announced his retirement  as a bandleader.

Personal life
Doyle has been married to Suzanne Lawson since 1978. He has one son, two daughters and a grandchild. Doyle rededicated his life to Christianity in May 1985 and is a practicing member of Cold Spring Presbyterian Church.

Band members
Original
Doyle Lawson-mandolin, vocal
Jimmy Haley-guitar,  vocal (1979-1985)
Lou Reid-bass,  vocal (1979-1982)
Terry Baucom-banjo, vocal (1979-1985, 2003-2007)

Final
Doyle Lawson-mandolin,  vocal
Eli Johnston-bass, banjo, vocal (2013-2018, 2020-2021)
Stephen Burwell-fiddle (2014-2020, 2021)
Jerry Cole-bass, guitar, vocal (2018-2021)
Matt Flake-fiddle, bass, vocal (2020-2021)
Ben James-guitar, vocal (2020-2021)

Other past members
Randy Graham-bass, vocal  (1982-1985)
Russell Moore-guitar, vocal (1985-1991)
Scott Vestal-banjo, vocal (1985-1988)
Curtis Vestal-bass, vocal (1985-1986)
Ray Deaton-bass, vocal (1986-1991)
Jim Mills-banjo, vocal (1988-1992)
Mike Hartgrove-fiddle (1989-1991, 2005-2007)
John Bowman-guitar, vocal (1991-1992)
Shelton Feazell-bass, vocal (1991-1993)
Shawn Lane-fiddle, guitar, vocal (1992-1994)
Jimmy Stewart-dobro, fiddle (1992-1994)
Brad Campbell-banjo, vocal (1992-1994)
John Berry-bass, vocal (1993-1994)
Barry Abernathy-banjo, vocal (1994-1998)
Dale Perry-bass, banjo, vocal (1994-2003, 2009-2011)
Steve Gulley-guitar, vocal (1994-1996)
Owen Saunders-fiddle (1994-1997)
Barry Scott-guitar, bass, vocal (1996-2005)
Jim VanCleve-fiddle (1997-1998)
Doug Bartlett-fiddle, vocal (1998-2001)
Jamie Dailey-bass, guitar, vocal (1998-2007)
Hunter Berry-fiddle (2001-2002)
Jesse Stockman-fiddle (2002-2005)
Jess Barry-fiddle (2002-2003)
Darren Beachley-bass, guitar, vocal (2005-2009)
Alan Johnson-fiddle, vocal  (2007-2008)
Joey Cox-banjo (2007-2009)
Carl White-bass, drums, vocal (2007-2009, 2011-2012)
Josh Swift-dobro, vocal (2007-2020)
Brandon Godman-fiddle (2008-2009)
Jason Barie-fiddle (2009-2014)
Corey Hensley-guitar, bass, vocal (2009-2013)
Jason Leek-bass, vocal (2009-2010)
Mike Rogers-guitar, vocal (2010-2013)
Jessie Baker-banjo (2011-2012)
Joe Dean-banjo, vocal (2012-2020)
Dustin Pyrtle-guitar, vocal (2013-2018)
Jake Vanover-guitar, vocal (2018-2020)

Timeline

Discography

Studio albums

Compilation albums

Awards

Lawson is a recipient of a 2006 National Heritage Fellowship awarded by the National Endowment for the Arts, which is the United States government's highest honor in the folk and traditional arts.

International Bluegrass Music Association
 1990 Song of the Year: Doyle Lawson and Quicksilver for "Little Mountain Church"
 1996 Gospel Recorded Performance of the Year: Doyle Lawson and Quicksilver for "There's a Light Guiding Me"
 2000 Gospel Recorded Performance of the Year: Doyle Lawson and Quicksilver for "Winding Through Life"
 2001 Vocal Group of the Year: Doyle Lawson and Quicksilver
 2002 Vocal Group of the Year: Doyle Lawson and Quicksilver
 2003 Vocal Group of the Year: Doyle Lawson and Quicksilver
 2003 Song of the Year: Doyle Lawson and Quicksilver for "Blue Train"
 2003 Gospel Recorded Performance of the Year: Doyle Lawson and Quicksilver for "Hand Made Cross"
 2004 Vocal Group of the Year: Doyle Lawson and Quicksilver
 2005 Vocal Group of the Year: Doyle Lawson and Quicksilver
 2005 Gospel Recorded Performance of the Year: Doyle Lawson and Quicksilver for "Praise His Name"
 2006 Vocal Group of the Year: Doyle Lawson and Quicksilver
 2006 Album of the Year: Celebration of Life: Musicians Against Childhood Cancer, featuring various bluegrass bands and musicians
 2006 Gospel Recorded Performance of the Year: Doyle Lawson and Quicksilver for "He Lives in Me"
 2007 Vocal Group of the Year: Doyle Lawson and Quicksilver
 2007 Gospel Recorded Performance of the Year: Doyle Lawson and Quicksilver for "He Lives in Me"
 2011 Recorded Event of the Year: Doyle Lawson, J. D. Crowe, Paul Williams for "Prayer Bells of Heaven"
 2011 Gospel Recorded Performance of the Year: Doyle Lawson, J. D. Crowe, Paul Williams for "Prayer Bells of Heaven"
 2012 Hall of Fame: Doyle Lawson

References

External links
 

1944 births
American bluegrass mandolinists
American male singers
The Country Gentlemen members
Living people
National Heritage Fellowship winners
People from Sullivan County, Tennessee
People from Hancock County, Tennessee
Singers from Tennessee
Southern gospel performers
Bluegrass Album Band members
New South (band) members